Tierra Grande is a census-designated place (CDP) in Nueces County, Texas, United States. The population was 403 at the 2010 census, up from 362 in 2000.

Geography
Tierra Grande is located at  (27.695622, -97.579631).

Demographics
As of the census of 2000, there were 362 people, 105 households, and 80 families residing in the CDP. The population density was 76.9 people per square mile (29.7/km2). There were 116 housing units at an average density of 24.6/sq mi (9.5/km2). The racial makeup of the CDP was 57.18% White, 1.38% African American, 1.66% Native American, 0.28% Asian, 0.28% Pacific Islander, 37.29% from other races, and 1.93% from two or more races. Hispanic or Latino of any race were 79.28% of the population.

There were 105 households, out of which 46.7% had children under the age of 18 living with them, 64.8% were married couples living together, 6.7% had a female householder with no husband present, and 22.9% were non-families. 17.1% of all households were made up of individuals, and 5.7% had someone living alone who was 65 years of age or older. The average household size was 3.45 and the average family size was 3.96.

In the CDP, the population was spread out, with 33.4% under the age of 18, 11.9% from 18 to 24, 29.6% from 25 to 44, 17.7% from 45 to 64, and 7.5% who were 65 years of age or older. The median age was 29 years. For every 100 females, there were 101.1 males. For every 100 females age 18 and over, there were 99.2 males.

The median income for a household in the CDP was $35,875, and the median income for a family was $36,750. Males had a median income of $21,071 versus $20,833 for females. The per capita income for the CDP was $17,686. About 15.7% of families and 22.7% of the population were below the poverty line, including 29.9% of those under age 18 and 7.1% of those age 65 or over.

Education
The community is divided mostly within West Oso Independent School District, with a small portion in Bishop Consolidated Independent School District. West Oso High School is the high school of the former.

References

Census-designated places in Nueces County, Texas
Census-designated places in Texas
Corpus Christi metropolitan area